Claus Bjørn Larsen (20 May 1954 – 12 May 2020) was a Danish footballer who played as a forward. He played in three matches for the Denmark national team in 1975.

References

External links
 
 

1954 births
2020 deaths
People from Høje-Taastrup Municipality
Danish men's footballers
Association football forwards
Denmark international footballers
Denmark youth international footballers
Denmark under-21 international footballers
Eredivisie players
Køge Boldklub players
Sparta Rotterdam players
Kjøbenhavns Boldklub players
Danish expatriate men's footballers
Danish expatriate sportspeople in the Netherlands
Expatriate footballers in the Netherlands
Sportspeople from Region Zealand
Sportspeople from the Capital Region of Denmark